Richard William Davis (November 7, 1941 – August 24, 2012) was an American child murderer, rapist and possible serial killer who was posthumously linked via DNA to the abduction and murder of 5-year-old Siobhan McGuinness, who was found raped and strangled near Turah, Montana on February 7, 1974. Davis had never been convicted or considered a suspect in any violent crime during his lifetime. He died of natural causes in 2012.

In the aftermath of his identification, he was additionally linked to an attempted kidnapping in Bath, New York in 1973. Due to the fact that he traveled extensively around the country, multiple state agencies and the FBI are currently investigating whether Davis can be linked to other violent crimes committed around the country.

Murder of Siobhan McGuinness

Disappearance and murder
In the early morning hours of February 5, 1974, 5-year-old Siobhan McGuinness went missing from her neighborhood in Missoula while en route to her home. On that same day, another young girl had reported that a stranger had attempted to lure her into a shed and molest her, but she managed to flee unharmed. 

K-9 units and volunteers organized a search to hopefully find McGuinness alive. Her father, Stephen, drew a facial composite of the stranger based on the unnamed girl's testimony, which depicted him as a Caucasian male with curly red hair, a medium build, approximately 5'11 and around 18–20 years old.

Three days later, McGuinness' body was found hidden in a highway culvert outside the city of Turah. The body was sent for an autopsy in Great Falls. Eventually, an autopsy concluded that McGuinness had been sexually assaulted, stabbed and repeatedly beaten on the head.

Cold case
Local residents organized a reward fund of $7,000 for any information that could lead to an arrest in the case. 

An unnamed 15-year-old youth was detained as a suspect in the case due to the fact that he owned a Cadillac with New York license plates, which police believed was driven by the perpetrator. After being subjected to a psychiatric evaluation and an interview, during which he was given truth serum, the youth's alibi was confirmed and he was officially exonerated as a suspect in the case.

The case quickly went cold. Over the following decades, the McGuinness case became a notorious unsolved murder in the state. Other cases from the surrounding area were solved and proven to be unrelated, including the murder of Donna Pounds and the abduction-killing of Susan Jaeger.

Identification and investigation
In 2018, genetic genealogy helped with the identification of the Golden State Killer, bringing more attention to the method as a means for solving cold cases. As DNA had been preserved in the McGuinness case, the Missoula County Sheriff's Office, BODE Technology and the FBI contacted Othram to develop a genetic profile of the suspected perpetrator. On October 26, 2020, the killer was officially identified as Richard William Davis, who had passed away from natural causes at his home in Cabot, Arkansas on August 24, 2012. 

At the time of the crime, Davis was 32. It is believed he was just passing through the state. Shortly after this announcement, he was additionally identified as the prime suspect in an attempted abduction of an 8-year-old girl from Bath, New York in 1973.

Davis, a native of Galeton, Pennsylvania, was born on November 7, 1941. He had never been suspected or convicted of any violent crime throughout his lifetime, and at the time of his death he was a born-again Christian who lived with his wife at their rural home in Cabot, Arkansas. He lived in Pennsylvania in the early 1960s before moving to several cities in South Dakota during the end of the decade. After living in Bath, New York, for some time, he moved to North Little Rock until the 1980s, whereupon he moved to Cabot. Until his death, he was a volunteer for the Big Brothers Big Sisters of America program.

Davis held various jobs and traveled around the country, including the states of Alaska, Colorado, Florida, Illinois, Mississippi, Montana, North Dakota, Ohio, Oklahoma, Oregon, Washington and Wyoming. Due to this, the FBI suspect that he is possibly responsible for further murders and assaults committed across the country, and are looking for information that could possibly link him to such cases.

See also
 Othram

References

External links
 Obituary (Archived)
 FBI ViCAP Bulletin

1941 births
2012 deaths
20th-century American criminals
American Christians
American kidnappers
American male criminals
American murderers of children
American rapists
Converts to Christianity
Criminals from Pennsylvania
People from Potter County, Pennsylvania
Suspected serial killers
Violence against children